Adam Cahan (born December 30, 1971) is an American consumer technology executive who was Senior Vice President of Mobile and Emerging Products for Yahoo!, where he oversaw the company's global mobile effort. In this role, he was responsible for leading product, engineering and design for Yahoo’s mobile products, Flickr and Smart TV.

Cahan joined Yahoo in April 2011 through the acquisition of his start-up IntoNow, a patented consumer application, which he sold to Yahoo for between $20 million and $30 million. When Marissa Mayer became CEO of Yahoo in 2012, she appointed Cahan to lead the company’s mobile initiatives, and he grew the division from 50 employees to over 900. From less than $11 Million in revenue to $1.8 Billion Since the company's mobile unit went live in October 2012, Yahoo has refreshed its Flickr and Mail apps, introduced News Digest, and bought nearly 40 companies. As of June 2014, Yahoo Mobile had 430 million monthly users.

In 2017, Cahan left Yahoo as the company was acquired by Verizon.

Prior to building IntoNow, Cahan's first start-up company was Auditude, a video infrastructure and ad serving company, which was later acquired by Adobe in 2011.

Cahan began his career as an associate producer and wildlife filmmaker for National Geographic Television, based in Zaire, Africa, from 1993 to 1996. He later became an executive vice president of strategy and business operations at MTV Networks, and held leadership roles at Google, McKinsey & Company and NBCUniversal. He holds two technology patents.

Background and personal life
A New York native, Cahan holds an undergraduate degree from Brown University and an MBA from Columbia Business School with Beta Gamma Sigma Honors.  His father, Dr. Amos Cahan, was a hematologist and the owner of Knickerbocker Biologicals, a medical diagnostics company that became part of Pfizer.

He married Alice Larkin, a British fashion designer, in 2002 and had two daughters with her. They divorced in 2014. On June 25, 2015, he welcomed daughter Alaska with Russian-American model Anne Vyalitsyna.

Cahan lives in San Francisco. Adam Cahan was a member of the Supervisory Board of ProSiebenSat.1 Media AG from June 2014 until the completion of the SE conversion in July 2015. Since completion of the conversion, he has been a member of the Supervisory Board of ProSiebenSat.1 Media SE. His current term of office will regularly end with the conclusion of the Annual Shareholders' Meeting in 2019.

References

1971 births
Living people
Yahoo! employees
American technology company founders
American technology chief executives
Brown University alumni
Columbia Business School alumni
National Geographic (American TV channel)
Google employees
McKinsey & Company people
NBCUniversal people
MTV executives